Double Sunrise Over Neptune is a live album by American jazz musician and composer William Parker, which was recorded in 2007 and originally released on the AUM Fidelity label. Though best known as a bassist, Parker on this album plays various ethnic double reed instruments and the African stringed instrument doussn'gouni.

Reception

In his review for AllMusic, Michael G. Nastos describes the album as perhaps the best of Parker's career, writing: "One who listens closely, and more than once, will reap great rewards from this, another excellent document in the growing and substantive discography of the consistently forward thinking Parker". 

The All About Jazz review noted "One of Parker's most fully realized large ensemble recordings, Double Sunrise Over Neptune is cosmic groove music with a global flair—a seamless merger of Eastern and Western traditions conveyed with passionate conviction". The JazzTimes review by Brent Burton commented "this groovy large ensemble recording acknowledges that a little freedom goes a long way. The occasional explosion of brass-and-string squall is more or less leavened by a cool-blue pulse"

Track listing
All compositions by William Parker
 "Morning Mantra" – 15:08
 "Lights of Lake George" – 27:24
 "O'Neal's Bridge" – 0:37
 "Neptune's Mirror" – 22:39

Personnel
William Parker – double reeds, doussn'gouni, conductor 
Sabir Mateen – tenor saxophone, clarinet
Rob Brown – alto saxophone
Bill Cole – double reeds
Dave Sewelson – baritone saxophone
Lewis Barnes – trumpet
Joe Morris – guitar, banjo
Sangeeta Bandyopadhyay – vocals
Jason Kao Hwang, Mazz Swift – violin
Jessica Pavone – viola
Shiau-Shu Yu – cello
Brahim Frigbane – oud
Shayna Dulberger – bass
Hamid Drake, Gerald Cleaver – drums

References

2007 live albums
AUM Fidelity live albums
William Parker (musician) live albums